Jeffery Trepagnier (born July 11, 1979) is a former American professional basketball player.

High school
Trepagnier played basketball at Compton High School, in Compton, California.

College career
Trepagnier played college basketball for the USC Trojans.  He also took second place at the 2000 Pac-10 Championships for the second year in a row with a high jump of 7-foot-1, tying for the fifth-best jump in USC school history.

Professional career
Trepagnier was a second round draft pick of the Cleveland Cavaliers in the 2001 NBA draft. At 6'4", Trepagnier was considered by some scouts to be undersized for the NBA shooting guard position, his natural spot. Trepagnier only played in 31 total NBA career games (12 for the Cavaliers and 19 for the Denver Nuggets) and averaged 2.8 points and 1.4 rebounds per game in his career. His final NBA game was played on April 14, 2004 in a 67 - 93 loss to the San Antonio Spurs. In his final game, Trepagnier played for 7 minutes and recorded 1 assist, 1 rebound but no points.

He spent the 2004–05 season for Italian club Eldo Napoli.
He signed with the Knights on June 25, 2006.

Trepagnier signed a contract with French club Élan Béarnais Pau-Orthez in December 2007.

In 2009, Trepagnier was playing for the Iowa Energy of the NBA D-League.

In 2010, he joined Scaligera Verona of the Italian second league.

In 2011, he signed to play in Brazil.

He later joined the Los Angeles Slam of the ABA.

Personal
Born in Los Angeles, Trepagnier is of African-American descent.

References

External links
Jeff Trepagnier NBA player profile @ NBA.com
Jeff Trepagnier NBA D-League player profile @ NBA.com
player profile @ Euroleague.net
Player profile @ Legabasket.it

1979 births
Living people
21st-century African-American sportspeople
African-American basketball players
American expatriate basketball people in Brazil
American expatriate basketball people in France
American expatriate basketball people in Italy
American expatriate basketball people in Turkey
American men's basketball players
American people of Creole descent
American people of French descent
Asheville Altitude players
Bakersfield Jam players
Basket Napoli players
Basketball players from Los Angeles
Charlotte Bobcats expansion draft picks
Cleveland Cavaliers draft picks
Cleveland Cavaliers players
Compton High School alumni
Denver Nuggets players
Élan Béarnais players
Iowa Energy players
Rio Grande Valley Vipers players
Scaligera Basket Verona players
Shooting guards
Ülker G.S.K. basketball players
USC Trojans men's basketball players
USC Trojans men's track and field athletes
20th-century African-American sportspeople